The University of Bahrain (informally Bahrain University, abbreviated as UOB) is the largest public university in the Kingdom of Bahrain with campuses in Sakhir, Isa Town and Manama, the university has more than 20,000 registered students and over 2,000 staff members.

The university is a member of the International Association of Universities and the Islamic Educational, Scientific and Cultural Organization.

History
The University of Bahrain was established in 1986 as a result of Amiri Decree No. 12 /1986. The decree resulted in the merger of two public colleges; the Gulf Polytechnic (previously established in 1968) and the University College of Arts, Science and Education (established in 1979).

Campus

The university has three campuses. Its main campus in Sakhir covers an area of 103657m2 and houses all the colleges except the Colleges of Health Science and Engineering. The College of Health Sciences is based in a  campus next to the Salmaniya Medical Complex. The College of Engineering is based in a  campus alongside the Bahrain Polytechnic.

The university owns a total of 66 buildings, 240 classrooms, 183 labs, and three gymnasiums. The university has four libraries, with the Central Library having an estimated 250,000 books in stock. The library also has access to the British Library database.

Colleges
The University of Bahrain receives US$110 million as a budget from the Bahraini government. The university itself consists of 10 constituent colleges:

S1A - College of Arts
S1B - College of Business Administration
S20B & S20C - College of Applied Studies
S20A - College of Physical Education & Physiotherapy
S22 - Bahrain Teachers College (BTC)
S39 - College of Law
S40 - College of Information Technology
S41 - College of Science
College of Engineering (Isa Town)
College of Health Sciences

Other buildings
Aside from colleges; the university includes other buildings around the main Sakhir campus for different purposes:
S37 - Admission & Registration
S17 - The Department of English Language and Literature & the Students Council Center
I14 - Engineering
I15 - Engineering
S18 - Exams Hall
S20 - The English Language Center
S47 - The IT & Science Library
Swimming Pool (Physical Education)
The Bahrain Credit Media Center
Zain E-Learning Center
The Confucius Institute for Chinese Language Courses
The King Sejong Institute for Korean Language Courses
Student & Teachers' Apartments
Gulf University Society Center
Printing Center

Academia

The university offers more than 102 academic programs, including 42 Bachelor programs, 39 Master's degrees, 10 PhDs and 11 associate diplomas. Credit hours vary between courses and degree level (126-135 credit hours for bachelor's degrees, for example). 
The university admits 15,000 students per annum, 80% of whom start in September.
The university's admission criteria generally require a high school score of 70%, in addition to other criteria imposed by some colleges.

Research
Since 1986, more than 5,000 research papers and books were published by academics in the university, 80% of which was produced by the Colleges of Science and Engineering respectively. The university allocates US$11 million annually towards research and supports 38 full-time research personnel. More than 500 Masters thesis was published since the university's inception.

Reputation
The university consistently ranks as the first nationally, 23rd amongst Arab universities and 801-1000 internationally according to QS World University Rankings as of 2020.

Student life
The university has 30,317 registered students at the start of the 2014/15 academic year, more than 65% of whom are female. 10.5% of the student population are international students. There were an estimated 700 events and activities in the 2012–13 academic year.
The university has a student council elected annually, with each constituent college electing a representative.

Notable alumni
Salman Bin Ibrahim Al-Khalifa, President of the Asian Football Confederation
Mohamed Ali Hasan Ali, Member of the Consultative Council

See also

 List of universities in Bahrain
 Education in Bahrain

References

Bibliography

External links
University of Bahrain
University of Bahrain 
UOB-BH Students' e-Community
UoB's Web Ranking

 
Educational institutions established in 1986
1986 establishments in Bahrain